Erbessa lindigii is a moth of the family Notodontidae first described by Cajetan and Rudolf Felder in 1874. It is found in Colombia and Panama.

The larvae feed on Miconia impetiolaris, Henriettea and Conostegia species.

References

Moths described in 1874
Notodontidae of South America